Sale Oval (also known as Sale Cricket Ground) is a cricket ground in Sale, Victoria, Australia.  The first recorded match on the ground was in 1967 when Sale-Maffra Cricket Association played the Cricket Club of India in 1967.  The ground held its only first-class match in 1989 when Victoria played the touring Sri Lankans.

The ground is also a venue for Australian Rules Football.

References

External links
Sale Oval at ESPNcricinfo
Sale Oval at CricketArchive

Cricket grounds in Victoria (Australia)
Sports venues in Victoria (Australia)
Sports venues completed in 1967
1967 establishments in Australia